Honeychurch is a village and former civil parish now in the parish of Sampford Courtenay, in the West Devon district of the English county of Devon. It was originally an ancient parish in the Black Torrington hundred of northwest Devon.

With about thirty inhabitants in 1066, the village is mentioned in the Domesday Book as "Honechercha". The description mentions five farms, which are still in operation in the 21st century. In 1870-72, John Marius Wilson's Imperial Gazetteer of England and Wales described Honeychurch in the following: 

In 1894 the parish was abolished and absorbed into the neighbouring parish of Sampford Courtenay. By 1894 there were only 8 houses. The village had 66 inhabitants in 1801, 69 in 1848, 35 in 1891, and 44 in 1901.

The 12th-century church, dedicated to Mary, is largely in its original state, save for the addition of the 15th-century three-bell tower and 16th-century portico in the south facade. The name of the village refers to the previous building on this site, "Huna's church", founded in the 10th century by the Saxon landowner Huna.

References

External links

Villages in the Borough of West Devon
Former civil parishes in Devon